Tales Told by Dead Men is a split album by English crossover thrash band Send More Paramedics and American crossover thrash/metalcore band Zombie Apocalypse.

Track listing
 "Just Meat"
 "God I Hope the Data Is Lying"
 "Breaking Off Fingers"
 "Murder be a Lady Tonight"
 "Tale Told by a Dead Man"
 "Intermission of the Dead"
 "From the Void"
 "Zombie VS Shark"
 "Funeral"
 "Nothing Tastes Like This"
 "This Is the Place of Wailing and the Gnashing of Teeth"

Tracks 1-5 are by Zombie Apocalypse. Tracks 6-11 are by Send More Paramedics.

Personnel
 Matt Fox - guitar
 Matthew Fletcher - bass 
 Ronen Kauffman - vocals
 Eric Dellon - vocals
 Greg Thomas - guitar
 B'Hellmouth - vocals
 Medico - guitar
 X Undead - bass
 El Diablo - drums
Macky – Photography

2005 albums
Send More Paramedics albums
Zombie Apocalypse (band) albums
Split albums